Barbora Dimovová (born 18 October 2000) is a Czech female canoeist who won five medals at senior level at the Wildwater Canoeing World Championships.

Medals at the World Championships
Senior

References

External links
 

2000 births
Living people
Czech female canoeists
Place of birth missing (living people)
Canoeists at the 2019 European Games
European Games competitors for the Czech Republic